The 1956 County Championship was the 57th officially organised running of the County Championship. Surrey won the Championship title for the fifth successive year.

Table
12 points for a win
6 points to side still batting in the fourth innings of a match in which scores finish level
4 points for first innings lead in a lost or drawn match
2 points for tie on first innings in a lost or drawn match
If no play possible on the first two days, the match played to one-day laws with 8 points for a win.

References

1956 in English cricket
County Championship seasons